Marengo is an unincorporated community in Columbia County, in the U.S. state of Washington.

The community was named after Louis "Marengo" Raboin, an early settler.

References

Unincorporated communities in Columbia County, Washington
Unincorporated communities in Washington (state)